Dieter Schidor (6 March 1948 – 17 September 1987) was a German actor, perhaps best known for his work in Sam Peckinpah's Cross of Iron, and Rainer Werner Fassbinder's Querelle.

Dieter Schidor was born on 6 March 1948 in Bienrode, today a part of Braunschweig, Germany. From 1977 to 1986, Schidor lived with the New Zealand actor and producer Michael McLernon, until his death from AIDS. Schidor died from AIDS on 17 September 1987 in Munich.

Filmography

References

External links 
 

1948 births
1987 deaths
Actors from Braunschweig
German male film actors
German male television actors
20th-century German male actors
AIDS-related deaths in Germany
German gay actors
20th-century German LGBT people